Echinolittorina malaccana is a species of sea snail, a marine gastropod mollusk in the family Littorinidae, the winkles or periwinkles.

Description
Size ranging from 0.8 - 1cm

Distribution
Echinolittorina malaccana are found mostly in the Western Indo-Pacific and Oceania region

References

Littorinidae
Gastropods described in 1847